A History of Marriage, published by Penguin Canada in 2009, is a non-fiction book by Elizabeth Abbott, the Canadian author of A History of Celibacy (1999) and A History of Mistresses (2003) that combines general history and personal histories of marriage.  The book is a study of mostly North American rituals of courting, nuptials, marriage, sex, child-raising and divorce.  Some topics covered are relative ages at which various societies from Chinese to Mormon married off their girls; details of the satisfying marriage of Martin Luther and former nun Katharina von Bora; the ruptured family units of Native American children removed to residential schools; the popularity of so-called Boston marriages (depicted by Henry James in The Bostonians) between like-minded women who resisted conventional marriage but weren't necessarily lesbian; and the scarcity of sponges used for contraception by Northern women during the Civil War because of the cut-off in supply from Florida.  A History of Marriage was a finalist for the 2010 Governor General's Literary Award for non-fiction.

References 

Canadian non-fiction books
Books about marriage
2009 non-fiction books
Penguin Books books